Kmanek Haburas Unidade Nasional Timor Oan (KHUNTO) is a political party in East Timor.

History
KHUNTO was officially registered on 22 June 2011 and is affiliated with the martial arts group Korka. In the 2012 parliamentary elections it received 2.97% of the vote, narrowly failing to cross the electoral threshold of 3%. However, in the 2017 parliamentary elections the party's vote share increased to 6.43% and it won five seats in the National Parliament.

Ideology
KHUNTO has made combating corruption the focus of its program. The party combines the democratic system with traditional Timorese beliefs as interpreted by ritual and martial arts groups in recent years. Although almost all East Timorese profess the Catholic faith, these ideas are widespread. Voters declare their loyalty to the party with a "blood oath" (juramento). According to belief, if it is not kept, the oath-breaker faces misfortune, illness and death. Conversely, the politicians are obliged by the oath of their electorate to help them with problems and not to enrich themselves through political offices. The details of the implementation of political goals are less relevant for the electorate than the trust that is placed in the KHUNTO members. In the event of a government takeover, the party aims to have state officials also swear a juramento, so that they would fear punishment by supernatural forces in the event of corruption. KHUNTO followers do not see the customary oath on the Bible as being so effective, because according to Christian belief, punishment for misconduct only occurs after death in the afterlife.

The binding of the voters through the oath seems only partially successful. According to a party leader, 89,000 voters passed the juramento ahead of the 2017 general election, but KHUNTO received only 36,547 votes. On the one hand, the votes came from the ranks of unemployed young people who see no prospects and are often supporters of the various martial arts groups, but the majority of the votes came from the rural regions of the country.

Election results
In the parliamentary elections of 2012, the KHUNTO failed with 13,998 votes (2.97%) at the three percent hurdle as the country's fifth strongest party. In her stronghold Ainaro she received votes, which corresponded to a share of 5.09%; in Manatuto with 1,085 votes even 5.33%. The KHUNTO also received over 3% in the former districts of Aileu (3.95%), Baucau (3.08%), Bobonaro (3.17%), Ermera (3.05%), Lautém (3.01%) and Liquiçá (3.19%).

In the parliamentary elections in East Timor in 2017, KHUNTO was the smallest party to enter parliament with 6.43% of the votes. and resulting in five seats. 

In the parliamentary elections on May 12, 2018, the AMP coalition managed to win 34 of the 65 seats and thus an absolute majority in parliament with a share of 49.6% (309,663 votes).

Presidential elections

Legislative elections

Gallery

References

Further reading

Political parties in East Timor
2011 establishments in East Timor
Political parties established in 2011